The Children's Court of Queensland is a specialized court in Queensland, a state of Australia which deals with serious crimes committed by children under the age of seventeen years in the state. 

Decisions made by the Children's Court of Queensland may be heard on appeal to the District Court of Queensland; and the Children's Court of Queensland has appellate jurisdiction where for matters heard before a magistrate of the Children's Court.

The court should not be confused with the Children's Court which is a division of the Magistrates' Court of Queensland.

Establishment
The court is established under the Children's Court Act 1992 (Qld). The court is a court of record and is an inferior court.  The court came into existence in 1992.

Composition
The court is constituted by either a single judge or a single magistrate depending on the nature of the crime allegedly committed.  In most cases, the matters will be dealt with by either a children's court judge or children's court magistrate.  However, if one is not available, then a district court judge or a magistrate may deal with the case even though they have not been appointed by the Governor of Queensland.

President of the Children's Court of Queensland
The Governor may appoint a president of the court.  The president must be a children's court judge. The major functions of the president are to oversee the court and ensure that its work is carried out quickly and effectively. There is no deputy president of the court.  However, the governor may appoint an acting president to act in the president's absence.

Other members of the Court

The Governor may appoint a judge of the District Court of Queensland as a judge to the Children's Court. Judges are appointed based on their experience and interest in dealing with the children's court jurisdiction. The Governor may also appoint other district court judges to act as children's court judges.

The Governor may appoint a magistrate as a Children's Court magistrate. The governor may also appoint other stipendiary magistrates as acting children's court magistrates.

The following are appointed as Children's Court judges as at April 2015:

John Robertson
Clive Wall RFD QC
Nicholas Samios
Deborah Richards
Sarah Bradley
Michael John Shanahan
Julie Dick SC
Paul Smith
Fleur Kingham
William Everson
Brian Devereaux SC
Brad Farr SC
Stuart Durward SC
John Baluch SC

Jurisdiction of Magistrates

A Children's Court magistrate has jurisdiction:
 to hear and determine all simple offences;
 to hear and determine most indictable offences if the child consents to it; and
 to conduct committal proceedings in relation to indictable offences.

A Children's Court magistrate also has powers to hear Child Protection matters pursuant to the Child Protection Act 1999.

Who may attend
Generally children's court cases are held in a closed court, although criminal offences dealt with by indictment are held in open court.  This is against the usual principle that all common law courts are open to public, and reflects that children are being dealt with inside the court.  Cases are held at different times to any other case being heard by the court on the day.

At a hearing, the following people may attend

the child;
their parent or other adult member of the child's family;
a witness giving evidence;
a person whose presence will provide emotional support to a witness;
certain welfare services; and
any other person who the court believes should be present.

Caseload

The Children's Court of Queensland as a whole (including Judges and Magistrates) dealt with 5,431 juveniles in 2005–06 compared with 6,996 in 2004-2005.  This represents a 22.4% decrease in the number of defendants. There was a 9.8% decrease in the number of juveniles appearing before a Children's Court Judge. Furthermore, there was an overall decrease of 29.3% in the number of charges brought against juveniles in Queensland in 2005-2006, at 1,771, down from 16,656 in the previous year. According to its Annual Review, unlawful entry with intent and theft (and related offences) accounted for 44.1% of all charges. Children's Court Magistrates disposed of 93% of juvenile cases in 2005-2006.

See also

 Australian court hierarchy
 Judiciary of Australia
 List of Queensland courts and tribunals

 Murri Court

References

External links

Queensland courts and tribunals
Children's courts in Australia
Courts and tribunals established in 1992
1992 establishments in Australia